Daniel Andrew Carlton (born 22 December 1983) is an English former professional footballer.

As a player, he was a forward from 2002 to 2014 before returning to football in 2015. He started his career with Morecambe before joining Carlisle United, he returned to Morecambe a year later for a loan spell. he then went on loan to Darlington before joining Bury on a permanent deal. He then had a loan spell at Grimsby Town and Morecambe again before completing a permanent move back to the club. He joined Hyde and retired after finishing his career with a loan spell at Chester.

In August 2015, Carlton returned to football, signing a contract with Lancaster City of the Northern Premier League.

Career

Morecambe
Born in Leeds, West Yorkshire, Carlton started his career with Morecambe, where he came through the youth ranks. He spent six years with Morecambe, making 180 appearances and scoring 59 goals in the league. Carlton scored the winning goal for Morecambe in the 2007 Conference National play-off Final, which saw the club promoted into the Football League with a 2–1 win over Exeter City.

Carlisle United
In the summer of 2007, Carlton signed for Carlisle United for a nominal fee. In his first season, he was mainly used as substitute. In total he made 46 appearances for Carlisle and scored 3 goals. All of his goals were scored at the beginning of the 2008–09 season, where on 9 August, he fired Carlisle to a 3–2 opening day victory away at Bristol Rovers, scoring twice. In the summer of 2009, Carlton was released from Carlisle.

Bury
On 1 July 2009, he signed for Bury. On 23 September 2010 he joined Grimsby Town on an initial one-month loan where he played five games before returning to Bury on 20 October 2010. He cancelled his contract by mutual consent with Bury on 31 January 2011.

Return to Morecambe
Carlton re-signed for Morecambe on a short-term deal in 2011. On 1 July he signed a deal for Morecambe a two-year contract after impressing before the end of the season. On 9 August 2011 he scored the first goal in the 2–0 win over Barnsley. On 10 September 2011 he scored the first hat-trick of his career in the 6–0 demolition over Crawley Town. On 3 September 2012, he was ruled out for seven months through injury.

Hyde FC & Chester FC
On 7 August 2013, Carlton signed for Conference Premier side Hyde after impressing in pre-season. At the end of the 2013–14 season, Carlton decided to retire after suffering with a long-standing knee injury having spent the last three months of the season  on loan at Chester.

Lancaster City
In August 2015, Carlton came out of retirement and signed for Northern Premier League side Lancaster City. Carlton had for part the 2014–15 season involved himself with North Lancashire and District Football League club CC Wanderers, helping with the running of the team and appearing on the odd occasion, however at the end of the season CC Wanderers folded and Carlton took up the opportunity to sign for The Dolly Blues.

Honours
Morecambe
Conference National play-offs: 2007

References

External links
 

1983 births
Living people
Footballers from Leeds
English footballers
Association football forwards
Morecambe F.C. players
Carlisle United F.C. players
Darlington F.C. players
Bury F.C. players
Hyde United F.C. players
Grimsby Town F.C. players
English Football League players
Chester F.C. players
Lancaster City F.C. players
National League (English football) players